The 2014 Challenger of Dallas was a professional tennis tournament played on indoor hard courts. It was the 17th edition of the tournament which was part of the 2014 ATP Challenger Tour. It took place in Dallas, United States between 3 and 9 February 2014.

Singles main-draw entrants

Seeds

 1 Rankings are as of January 27, 2014.

Other entrants
The following players received wildcards into the singles main draw:
  Jean Andersen
  Jared Donaldson
  John Mee
  Clay Thompson

The following players got into the singles main draw as a special exempt:
  Daniel Kosakowski

The following players got into the singles main draw as an alternate:
  Chase Buchanan

The following players received entry from the qualifying draw:
  Dennis Nevolo
  Evan King
  Justin S. Shane
  Nicolas Meister

Champions

Singles

 Steve Johnson def.  Malek Jaziri, 6–4, 6–4

Doubles

 Samuel Groth /  Chris Guccione def.  Ryan Harrison /  Mark Knowles, 6–4, 6–2

External links
Official Website

Challenger of Dallas
Challenger of Dallas
Challenger of Dallas
Challenger of Dallas
Challenger of Dallas